Pentti Kanerva is an American neuroscientist who is the originator of the sparse distributed memory model. He is responsible for relating the properties of long-term memory to mathematical properties of high-dimensional spaces and compares artificial neural-net associative memory to conventional computer random-access memory and to the neurons in the brain. This theory has been applied to design and implement the random indexing approach to learning semantic relations from linguistic data.

Education
Kanerva has an A.A. from Warren Wilson College,  M.S. in forestry, with a minor in mathematics and statistics from the University of Helsinki, and has a Ph.D. in Philosophy, from Stanford University.

Career
After earning his Ph.D. at Stanford in 1984, Kanerva moved to work at NASA's Ames Research Center. He also worked at the Swedish Institute of Computer Science, before taking a position at the Redwood Neuroscience Institute of the University of California, Berkeley.

References

American neuroscientists
Living people
Year of birth missing (living people)